Pemberton is an unincorporated community in Raleigh County, West Virginia, United States. The Pemberton post office closed on January 23, 1993, with Mrs. Gladys G. St.Clair  serving as the last postmaster.

References

Unincorporated communities in Raleigh County, West Virginia
Unincorporated communities in West Virginia
Coal towns in West Virginia